Ben McCartney (born July 13, 2001) is a Canadian professional ice hockey forward currently playing for the Tucson Roadrunners of the American Hockey League (AHL) as a prospect for the Arizona Coyotes of the National Hockey League (NHL). McCartney was drafted 204th overall by the Coyotes in the 2020 NHL Entry Draft and made his NHL debut in 2021.

Playing career
McCartney played major junior hockey in the Western Hockey League (WHL) with the Brandon Wheat Kings and was selected by the Coyotes in the seventh-round, 204th overall by the Arizona Coyotes in the 2020 NHL Entry Draft. He was signed to a three-year, entry-level contract with the Coyotes on May 27, 2021.

Career statistics

References

External links
 

2001 births
Living people
Arizona Coyotes draft picks
Arizona Coyotes players
Brandon Wheat Kings players
Canadian ice hockey left wingers
Ice hockey people from Manitoba
Tucson Roadrunners players